The Transitional National Legislative Assembly is the lower house of the Transitional National Legislature of South Sudan.

Composition

2011-2016
Following independence in 2011, the National Legislative Assembly comprises:
all persons who were members of the Southern Sudan Legislative Assembly; and
all South Sudanese who were members of the National Assembly of Sudan, by virtue of their membership in that Assembly.

Members of the Council of Ministers who are not members of the National Legislative Assembly must participate in its deliberations but do not have the right to vote. Persons who wish to become members of the National Legislative Assembly must fulfill the eligibility requirements set down by the Constitution for membership of the National Legislature.

2016-2021

As a result of a peace agreement that came into effect in 2013, the National Legislative Assembly was reconstituted as the Transitional National Legislative Assembly with 400 members. The membership is as follows:

332 members of the former National Legislative Assembly
50 members representing the armed opposition
17 members representing other parties and groups 
 1 member representing former detainees

2021-present

As a result of a peace agreement that came into effect in February 2020, a new Transitional National Legislative Assembly with 550 members was nominated in May 2021. The membership is as follows:

332 members of the former National Legislative Assembly (mainly from Sudan People's Liberation Movement)
128 members representing the Sudan People's Liberation Movement-in-Opposition
50 members representing South Sudan Opposition Alliance
30 members representing other opposition groups
 10 members representing former detainees

Speakers of the National Assembly

Role 
The Transitional National Legislative Assembly exercises the following functions:
overseeing the performance of the National Government institutions;
approving plans, programmes and policies of the National Government;
approving budgets;
ratifying international treaties, conventions and agreements;
adopting resolutions on matters of public concern;
summoning Ministers to answer questions of members of the Assembly on matters related to their ministries;
interrogating Ministers about their performance or the performance of their ministries;
approving appointments as required by the Transitional Constitution or the law;
casting a vote of no confidence against the Vice President and any Minister;
enacting legislation to regulate the conditions and terms of service of the Judiciary and its oversight mechanisms; and
performing any other function as determined by the Transitional Constitution or the law.

See also 
Southern Sudan Legislative Assembly – the preceding assembly 2005–2011

References 

Politics of South Sudan
Political organisations based in South Sudan
2011 establishments in South Sudan
Government of South Sudan
South Sudan